Hârlău (also spelled Hîrlău, ;) is a town in Iași County, Western Moldavia, Romania. It was one of the princely court cities of Moldavia, in the 15th century. One village, Pârcovaci, is administered by the town.

Geography

Hârlău lies on the banks of the Bahlui River. It is crossed by national road , which is part of European route E58. The Hârlău train station is the terminus of the CFR Line 607, which starts at the Iași railway station.

Population
The 2011 census counted 10,905 inhabitants, 93.85% Romanians, and 6.06% Roma. A large Jewish community used to live in Hârlău.

Natives
 Lucian Boz (1908–2003), literary critic, essayist, novelist, poet, and translator
  (1869–1943), writer, journalist, and politician
 Mihail Davidoglu (1910–1987), playwright
  (born 1946), historian
  (1895—1976), jurist and politician
  (1894–1974), Catholic priest
 Petru Rareș (1483–1546), voivode of Moldavia
 Mordecai Sandberg (1897–1973), composer and physician

References

External links
 The General Archive of The History of The Jewish People. RM 160, 164.

Towns in Romania
Populated places in Iași County
Localities in Western Moldavia